Paur is a surname. Notable people with the name include:

Emil Paur (1855–1932), Austrian orchestra conductor
Frank Paur, American television director of animated cartoons
Gary Paur (born  1947), American politician
Jakub Paur (born 1992), Slovak football midfielder 
Leonard De Paur (1914–1998), African-American composer, choral director and arts administrator
Toomas Paur (born 1949), Estonian politician.

See also
Pauer